Claude Tollet (Roisel, 24 April 1949) was a French professional road bicycle racer, who won stage 17 in the 1973 Tour de France.

Major results

1972
GP de Lillers
1973
Hénin-Beaumont
Tour de France:
Winner stage 17

See also
List of doping cases in cycling

External links 

Official Tour de France results for Claude Tollet

1949 births
Living people
Sportspeople from Somme (department)
French male cyclists
French Tour de France stage winners
Doping cases in cycling
French sportspeople in doping cases
Cyclists from Hauts-de-France